Two ships of the Royal Navy have been named HMS Asphodel :

  an  sloop launched in 1915 and sold to the Royal Danish Navy in 1920 who renamed her Fylla
 , a  launched in 1940 and lost in 1944

Royal Navy ship names